USS Ulua (SS-428), a Balao-class submarine, was the only ship of the United States Navy named for the ulua, an important food fish of the tropical Pacific Ocean. She was never completed.

Uluas keel was laid down on 13 November 1943 at Philadelphia by the Cramp Shipbuilding Company, but the curtailment of U.S. Navy construction programs in the closing days of World War II resulted in the suspension of further construction on 12 August 1945.

The partly completed submarine was launched on 23 April 1946 and towed to the Portsmouth Naval Shipyard in Kittery, Maine, for maintenance prior to beginning her career as a test hull. Towed to Norfolk, Virginia, in 1951, she participated in tests to gather research data on new weapon and submarine design.

Ulua was stricken from the Naval Vessel Register list on 12 June 1958. Her hulk was sold for scrap on 30 September 1958 to the Portsmouth Salvage Company, Inc.

References

External links
 Photo gallery at navsource.org

 

Balao-class submarines
Cancelled ships of the United States Navy
Ships built by William Cramp & Sons
United States Navy ship names
1946 ships